Bellingen is an Ortsgemeinde – a community belonging to a Verbandsgemeinde – in the Westerwaldkreis in Rhineland-Palatinate, Germany.

Geography
Bellingen lies in a hollow northwest of Westerburg. Since 1972 it has belonged to what was then the newly founded Verbandsgemeinde of Westerburg, a kind of collective municipality.

Politics

The municipal council is made up of 8 council members, including the extraofficial mayor (Bürgermeister), who were elected in a majority vote in a municipal election on 7 June 2009.

Economy and infrastructure

South of the community runs Bundesstraße 255, leading from Montabaur to Herborn. The nearest Autobahn interchange is Montabaur on the A 3. The nearest InterCityExpress stop is the railway station at Montabaur on the Cologne-Frankfurt high-speed rail line.

References

External links
 Bellingen in the collective municipality’s Web pages 

Municipalities in Rhineland-Palatinate
Westerwaldkreis